Mars Chronicles is a limited vinyl album by electronica group Kreidler, released in 2011.

Track listing
Mars Chronicles I–IV

I "LX" – 8:14

II "Sølyst" – 7:37

III "April Moon" – 9:33

IV "Lo Firer Esplendor"  – 6:02

Credits
Recorded in Hamburg, Electric Avenue, by Tobias Levin.

Mixed in Berlin (I & III) and Düsseldorf (II & IV).

Mastered & Cut in Berlin, Dubplates & Mastering, by Rashad Becker.

Production
The record contains 4 different remixes of a song called Mars, with each member of the band contributing a version.  "LX" can be attributed to Alex Paulick, "Sølyst" is Thomas Klein's moniker for his solo-albums, Andreas Reihse has released as "April", which leaves "Lo Firer Esplendor" to Detlef Weinrich.

Mars Chronicles seems to be a verbicide on Ray Bradbury's book The Martian Chronicles (in German: "Die Mars Chroniken").

Release
The album is the second collaboration between Georgian artist Andro Wekua and the band – after the album "Tank" earlier in 2011.

It was released August 2011 in a hand-numbered edition of 100 (plus 30 Artist's proofs) on Dutch/German label en/of (EN/OF 043).

The first flapper of the gatefold sleeve holds Sunset a photo print signed by Andro Wekua, the second flapper the vinyl.

Notes

External links
 en/of

2011 albums
Kreidler (band) albums